Members of the New South Wales Legislative Council from 1978 to 1981 held office following the 1978 referendum which reduced the number of members from 60 to 43, provided for the direct election of members of the Legislative Council and that members would serve for 3 terms of the Legislative Assembly. Only 15 of the 43 members had been elected at the 1978 Legislative Council election. Under the transitional arrangements, 28 members had been indirectly elected by joint sittings of the New South Wales Parliament, with 14 of those members to retire at the next general election, held in 1981, and the remaining 14 members would retire at the following general election, held in 1984.

The President was Johno Johnson.

References

See also
Second Wran ministry
Third Wran ministry

Members of New South Wales parliaments by term
20th-century Australian politicians